Karl-Heinz Weigang (24 August 1935 – 12 June 2017) was a German professional football manager. He had vast experience in coaching international football, having managed the likes of Sri Lanka, Vietnam, Mali, Ghana and Gabon over a career that spanned more than half a century. However, he is best remembered for his time with Malaysia in the early 1980s, when he led the national team to qualify for the 1980 Olympic Games. He was also a popular figure in the Malaysian league, where he had some domestic success over his multiple stints with Perak, the last being his role as coach and technical advisor in 2016.

Career 
As national coach, Weigang guided Malaysia to qualify for the 1980 Moscow Olympic Games as group leaders, although the country eventually boycotted the Games that year in protest of the Soviet invasion of Afghanistan.

He was conferred the FIFA Order of Merit and CAF Order of Merit in 1998 for his contribution towards Asian and African football.

On club level, he guided Perak to win the Malaysia Cup in 1998 and 2000.

Cultural reference 
Weigang's role in the 1980 Olympic qualification became the inspiration of the character Harry Mountain (played by Mark Williams) in Ola Bola, a widely acclaimed Malaysian sports film in 2016.

Death 
Weigang had a contract with Perak until June 2017, but was "rested" since February as he left for Germany for an eye surgery and a football course. He died of a heart attack there on 12 June 2017, at the age of 81.

Honours

Manager
South Vietnam
Merdeka Cup: 1966

SEAP Games: silver medal 1967

Mali
African Cup of Nations: runner-up 1972

Malaysia
SEA Games: Gold medal 1979; silver medal 1981

Vietnam
SEA Games: silver medal 1995

Perak
Malaysia Cup: 1998, 2000

Malaysia Charity Shield: 1999

Individual
 FIFA Order of Merit: 1998

 CAF Order of Merit: 1998

See also 

 1980 Summer Olympics – Men's Asian Qualifiers

References

1935 births
2017 deaths
Malaysia national football team managers
Expatriate football managers in Malaysia
Expatriate football managers in Mali
German football managers
Expatriate football managers in Ghana
Vietnam national football team managers
Mali national football team managers
Ghana national football team managers
Gabon national football team managers
Expatriate football managers in Vietnam
1980 AFC Asian Cup managers
1972 African Cup of Nations managers
West German expatriate sportspeople in Mali
German expatriate sportspeople in Malaysia
West German football managers
West German expatriate football managers
West German expatriate sportspeople in Malaysia
German expatriate sportspeople in Gabon
West German expatriate sportspeople in Gabon
German expatriate sportspeople in Vietnam
West German expatriate sportspeople in Vietnam
West German expatriate sportspeople in Sri Lanka
West German expatriate sportspeople in Cameroon